Triple Z (call sign: 2ZZZ) is a commercial radio station covering New South Wales' Far North Coast, and is part of the Broadcast Operations Group. The station targets the 18-39 market with a mostly top 40 hits format, though in networking hours the format shifts to a more adult contemporary mix.

It began broadcasting on 1 January 1994, from its Goonellabah studios. First announcer on air was Dave Williams, followed by Vashti Stewart, Neil Marks & Mike O'Reilly. The first song played on air was "The Heat Is On" by Glenn Frey.

External links
100.9 Triple Z FM, Official Website

Radio stations in New South Wales
Radio stations established in 1994
Hot adult contemporary radio stations in Australia
Broadcast Operations Group
1994 establishments in Australia